Vetri Sudley, known professionally as Vetri, is an Indian actor who appears in Tamil films. He is best known for playing the lead role in his own family production films such as 8 Thottakkal (2017) and Jiivi (2019).

Career
Vetri is the son of Producer M. Vellapandian. He debuted in the role of sub inspector in the 2017 critically acclaimed film 8 Thottakkal which was produced by his father. He then appeared in the thriller film Jiivi (2019) which was opened to positive reviews and declared a super hit. In 2021 he appeared in the anthology film C/O Kaadhal which was the remake of the Telugu film C/o Kancharapalem. His next film Vanam released on 26 November 2021. In 2022, he appeared in Jothi followed by Jiivi 2 which is a sequel to the 2019 crime drama is release on a popular OTT platform.

Filmography

References

External links

Living people
Male actors in Tamil cinema
21st-century Indian male actors
Male actors from Chennai
Year of birth missing (living people)